Muki was an English acid jazz duo, consisting of Luke Mullen and Jules Evans. Their first single, "Jahbar", was released in 1996. This was followed by two albums on the Mantra Recordings label, both of which combines funk drumming (Evans), jazz keyboards (Mullen), electronic programming and guest vocals.

Discography

Singles
"Jahbar" (1996)
"Shine" (1998)
"I Don't Want to Know" (featuring Sophie Barker, 2000)
"Munk Funk" (2000)

Albums
Cabin Fever (1998)
Quiet Riot (2000)

External links
Muki page at Mantra Recordings

Acid jazz ensembles
English electronic music duos